Ferdinand Grossmann (4 July 1887 – 5 December 1970) was an Austrian choral conductor, vocal teacher and composer.

He studied music in Linz. Some years later in Vienna he attended a class of conducting given by Felix Weingartner.

In 1923 he established the Wiener Volkskonservatorium. He later became the artistic director of the Wiener Sängerknaben, and led the choir to gain international reputation.

External links
 Ferdinand Grossmann biography on Bach cantatas
 Ferdinand Grossmann biography
 Ferdinand Grossman's grave

1887 births
1970 deaths
Male conductors (music)
20th-century Austrian conductors (music)
20th-century Austrian male musicians